Elections to Hyndburn Borough Council were held on 2 May 2002. The whole council was up for election with boundary changes since the last election in 2000 reducing the number of seats by 12. The Labour party gained overall control of the council from the Conservative party.

Election result

Boundary changes took place for the 2002 election. The number of councillors was reduced from 45 to 35 but the number of wards remained similar but not exactly the same.

Ward results

References
2002 Hyndburn election result
Tories ousted in nailbiting finish
 Ward results

2002 English local elections
2002
2000s in Lancashire